Upper Denkyira West is one of the constituencies represented in the Parliament of Ghana. It elects one Member of Parliament (MP) by the first past the post system of election. The Upper Denkyira West constituency is located in the Upper Denkyira district of the Central Region of Ghana.

Boundaries
The seat is located entirely within the Upper Denkyira district of the Central Region of Ghana.

History 
The constituency was created when it was carved out of the Upper Denkyira constituency prior to the Ghanaian parliamentary election in 2004. This was when the Electoral Commission of Ghana created 29 new constituencies. What was left became the  Upper Denkyira East constituency.

Members of Parliament 

From 2016 to 2020
Samuel Nsowah Djan

Elections
Daniel Ohene Darko, the current MP for the constituency was first elected in 2020<ref>{{cite web |url=http://www.ec.gov.gh/userfiles/Central.pdf |title=Electoral.

See also
List of Ghana Parliament constituencies
Upper Denkyira District

References 

Parliamentary constituencies in the Central Region (Ghana)